Trust is the sixth studio album by American indie rock band Low. It was released on October 21, 2002 on the Kranky label. The album was mastered by John Golden, mixed by Tchad Blake and recorded by Tom Herbers.

Track listing

References

2002 albums
Low (band) albums
Kranky albums